SysMaster is a platform independent application performance management (APM) solution developed by TmaxSoft. It provides a centralized environment for monitoring and managing a wide range of system components and processes, including system-critical components such as DBMS, middleware and Frameworks. APM solutions help systems operate stably by monitoring the state of applications in real time.  SysMaster is designed to be capable of tracing every event that occurs within an integrated IT environment in real time with the purpose of identifying issues that could potentially affect system performance, as they occur, before they actually affect the system.

History 

SysMaster was launched in December 2004.  The following table shows a list of versions and release dates:

Features 

The main features of SysMaster are that it is hardware and OS independent, provides end to end transaction tracing and has a Web-based IU.

SysMaster can be used to monitor and manage the performance of web servers, web application servers, TP monitors, application servers, etc.

It uses TmaxSoft’s own technologies for middleware, frameworks, and databases to minimize overheads for collecting, transmitting, manufacturing, storing, and searching data. It provides integrated, customizable dashboards and reports and detailed transaction monitoring allowing drill-down analysis.

References

Cross-platform software